HVDC Ekibastuz–Centre is an unfinished HVDC transmission line between Ekibastuz in Kazakhstan and Tambov (Centre substation) in Russia whose construction was started in 1978.
At Ekibastuz construction work at the terminal was started, while it was not the case at Centre substation, Tambov.

Sites 

 Centre Substation: 
 Gryazi Substation 
 Volga Crossing: 
 Ekibastuz Electrode Line Branch: 
 Ekibastuz HVDC Static Inverter Plant:

References

External links 

 Voropai/ Shutov 'Dynamic Properties Of Bulk Power Interconnections' www.ucte-ipsups.org (1996)
 Photograph of unused pylon
 Pylons in 2009
 Pylons in 2012
 Picture of line
 Track of line according to Openstreetmap
 Map showing course of line
 Map showing course of line
 Map showing course of line
 Map showing course of line

HVDC transmission lines
Electric power infrastructure in Russia
Electric power infrastructure in Kazakhstan
Energy in the Soviet Union